Pulpit Rock is a rock located in Cape Schanck, Victoria, Australia. It is in the Mornington Peninsula National Park, near the Bass Strait.

Pulpit Rock is a geological formation created by volcanic activity over millions of years.  Its base is called Devils Desk (see image below).

A painting of the rock by Nicholas Chevalier (1828–1902) is held in the Art Gallery of New South Wales.

Erosion
Pulpit Rock was eroded constantly by large waves and heavy winds over millions of years, thus its unique appearance.

References

Landforms of Victoria (Australia)
Mornington Peninsula